Nephele joiceyi is a moth of the  family Sphingidae. It is known from Indonesia (including Sumatra).

References

Nephele (moth)
Moths described in 1923